National Maritime Museum may refer to:
 Australian National Maritime Museum
 Deutsches Schiffahrtsmuseum, Germany
 National Maritime Museum of Ireland
 National Maritime Museum, Indonesia
 National Maritime Museum, Israel
 National Maritime Museum, Malta
 National Maritime Museum, New Zealand
 National Maritime Museum, South Korea
 National Maritime Museum (Galle), Sri Lanka
 National Maritime Museum, the original museum of this type, Greenwich, United Kingdom
 National Maritime Museum Cornwall, United Kingdom
 Mariners' Museum, the National Maritime Museum of the United States
 San Francisco Maritime National Historical Park

See also
 :Category:Maritime museums
 Maritime museum